Nitratireductor pacificus is a Gram-negative and motile bacteria from the genus of Nitratireductor which was isolated from enriched sediment from the Pacific Ocean.

References

Phyllobacteriaceae
Bacteria described in 2011